Peter Hanrahan (born 23 February 1968, in Limerick) was an Irish soccer player during the 1980s and 1990s.

He was a midfielder or forward who played for UCD, Dundalk, Limerick City, Bohemians during his career in the League of Ireland.

Hanrahan began his career at UCD, making his League of Ireland debut at Newcastlewest F.C. on 19 October 1986, and helped them to promotion in 1988–89. During his time at UCD he also played for Irish Universities.

He then moved to his home town club and made his debut for his home club on the opening day of the 1989–90 in a controversial game where the referee was assaulted as the home side lost.

After only one season Hanrahan moved to Dundalk F.C. where he was Player of the Month in October 1990. He was top scorer in the 1990–91 League of Ireland Premier Division with 18 league goals  and was awarded the SWAI Personality of the Year for that season. He also picked a league winners medal that season with Dundalk. He moved to Bohs in the mid 90s and made 115 league appearances (16 goals) during his 5 seasons at the club. In 1999, he returned to UCD to finish his career.

He is the brother of fellow footballer Joe with whom he played alongside at Bohs for a short spell.

Peter has two children, Sophie (born 23 February 2001) and Ben (born 20 April 1998), who plays for UCD.

Honours
League of Ireland Premier Division: 1 Dundalk F.C. - 1990–91SWAI Personality of the Year: 1
 Dundalk F.C. - 1990–91Collingwood Cup: 1
 University College Dublin A.F.C. - 1987

References

Republic of Ireland association footballers
League of Ireland players
Bohemian F.C. players
Dundalk F.C. players
University College Dublin A.F.C. players
Limerick F.C. players
1968 births
Living people
Association football forwards
League of Ireland XI players